Jalalabad is the capital of Nangarhar province in Afghanistan.

Jalalabad  or Dzhalalabad may also refer to:

Azerbaijan
Cəlilabad, which may also be spelled "Jalilabad"

Bangladesh
Jalalabad, a union parishad in Sylhet district, Bangladesh

India
Jalalabad, Bijnor, settlement of Bijnor district, Uttar 
Jalalabad, Fazilka, settlement of Fazilka district, Punjab
Jalalabad, Punjab Assembly constituency
Jalalabad, Muzaffarnagar, settlement of Muzaffarnagar district, Uttar Pradesh
Jalalabad, Shahjahanpur, settlement of Shahjahanpur district, Uttar Pradesh
Jalalabad (UP Assembly constituency)
Mangalore, temporarily renamed Jalalabad by Tipu Sultan in the late 18th century

Iran

Ardabil Province
Jalalabad, Ardabil, a village in Khalkhal County

Fars Province
Jalalabad, Darab, a village in Darab County
Jalalabad, Fasa, a village in Fasa County
Jalalabad, Kavar, a village in Kavar County
Jalalabad, Larestan, a village in Larestan County
Jalalabad, Shiraz, a village in Shiraz County

Golestan Province
Jalalabad, Golestan, a village in Azadshahr County

Hormozgan Province
Jalalabad, Hormozgan, a village in Rudan County

Isfahan Province
Jalalabad, Chadegan, a village in Chadegan County
Jalalabad, Falavarjan, a village in Falavarjan County
Jalalabad, Qahab-e Jonubi, a village in Isfahan County
Jalalabad, Baharestan, a village in Nain County
Jalalabad, Kuhestan, a village in Nain County
Jalalabad, Najafabad, a village in Najafabad County
Jalalabad, Semirom, a village in Semirom County

Kerman Province
Jalalabad 2, a village in Bardsir County
Jalalabad, Fahraj, a village in Fahraj County
Jalalabad, Jiroft, a village in Jiroft County
Jalalabad, Narmashir, a village in Narmashir County
Jalalabad, Rabor, a village in Rabor County
Jalalabad, Ravar, a village in Ravar County
Jalalabad, Sharifabad, a village in Sirjan County
Jalalabad, Zarand, a village in Zarand County

Markazi Province
Jalalabad, Farahan, a village in Farahan County
Jalalabad, Shazand, a village in Shazand County

Razavi Khorasan Province
Jalalabad, Shahrabad, a village in Bardaskan County
Jalalabad, Firuzeh, a village in Firuzeh County
Jalalabad, Mashhad, a village in Mashhad County
Jalalabad, Rashtkhvar, a village in Rashtkhvar County
Jalalabad, Torbat-e Heydarieh, a village in Torbat-e Heydarieh County

Sistan and Baluchestan Province
Jalalabad, Dalgan, a village in Dalgan County
Jalalabad, Hirmand, a village in Hirmand County
Jalalabad, Mehrestan, a village in Mehrestan County

West Azerbaijan Province
Jalalabad, West Azerbaijan, a village in Khoy County

Yazd Province
Jalalabad, Abarkuh, a village in Abarkuh County
Jalalabad, Ardakan, a village in Ardakan County
Jalalabad-e Dezak, a village in Saduq County
Jalalabad, Taft, a village in Taft County

Zanjan Province
Jalalabad, Zanjan, a village in Zanjan County

Kyrgyzstan
Jalal-Abad, a city in southwestern Kyrgyzstan
Jalal-Abad Province

Pakistan
 Jalalabad, Gilgit, a village in Gilgit-Baltistan region
 Jalalabad, Karachi, a place in Sindh, Pakistan.
 Jalalabad, Multan, village in Multan District, Pakistan
 Jalalabad, Muzaffargarh, village in Muzaffargarh District
 Jalalabad, Sargodha, village in Sargodha District

See also
 Jalilabad (disambiguation)